Bizzy Bone's discography includes 18 studio albums, 6 compilation albums and 7 singles. American rapper Bizzy Bone has released albums under 11 different record labels during his career and has been signed to major labels Virgin Records and Warner Bros. Records. He is currently signed to record label 7th Sign. Bizzy Bone has had 8 albums chart on the Billboard 200 chart. His debut album, Heaven'z Movie, released in 1998, peaked at no. 3 on the Billboard 200 and was certified gold in the United States. Bizzy Bone has also released 31 music videos and 10 collaboration albums. He has made collaboration albums with artists including Layzie Bone and Bad Azz.

Albums

Studio albums

Collaboration albums
Bizzy Bone Presents: Double R with Double R (2003)
Bone Brothers with Bone Brothers (2005)
Bone Collector with Q Loco (2006)
Bone Brothers 2 with Bone Brothers (2007)
Bone Brothers 3 with Bone Brothers (2008)
Still Creepin on Ah Come Up with Bone Brothers (2008)
Thug Pound with Bad Azz (2009)
Destination Ailleurs with Papillon Bandana (2010)
Bone Collector 2 with Q Loco (2011)
Countdown to Armageddon with AC Killer (2011)
Battle of Armageddon with AC Killer (2015)
New Waves with Krayzie Bone (2017)

Compilation albums
The Best of Bizzy Bone (2007)
Only One (2006)
Revival (2008)
The Best of Bizzy Bone 2 (2010)
Greatest Rapper Alive (2010)
Mr. Ouija (2011)
7th Sign Tribute Record: The Sign of Seven (2013)
Criminal Nation Organization Vol 6: Best of Part One, The Criminal Nation Organization (2014)

Soundtracks 
The PJs "Way 2 Strong" (1998)
Blade "Blade 4 Glory" featuring Mr. Majesty (1998)
Next Friday "Fried Day" (1999)
True Crime - Streets Of L.A. "Hollywood" (2003)

Extended plays
For the Fans Vol. 1 (2005)
From Your Righteousness (2009)
Crossover 2010 (2010)
The Wonder Years (2014)

Guest appearances

Music videos

References

Discographies of American artists
Hip hop discographies